A ginnel is a fenced or walled alley between residential buildings that provides a pedestrian shortcut to nearby streets. They are typically found in suburban areas, and do not contain any business premises, unlike some other types of alley. Other terms include, snicket, tenfoot and snickleway.

Origins

In 1744, pharmacist Arthur Jessop wrote a subpoena that mentioned Joseph Eastwood's wife in the "Ginnil" in the Low at Holmfirth. A subdivision of the Taylor family was said to be of Ginnel in Meltham in 1774. In most works, there is no broad distinction drawn between ginnel and snicket, and the two have been used interchangeably.

Both are described as north-country words for a narrow entrance between houses. However, in the Holme Valley, it has been said that a ginnel goes uphill and has setts whereas a snicket does not, and is surrounded by vegetation. "Ginnel" is a dialect word from Yorkshire, UK, which appeared in dialect dictionaries in the 19th century.

Etymology
The Oxford English Dictionary states that its etymology is vague, though it compares the word to ‘channel’ (in addition to being its corruption) and with a definition of "a long, narrow passage between houses, either roofed or unroofed". In The English Dialect Dictionary it is differentiated with "entry", and is said to feature a roof, unlike a ginnel. Furthermore, the editors of Yorkshire glossaries had asserted a connection between ginnel and a Scandinavian word for ‘mouth’, since the ginnel was originally an opening. 

According to Collins Dictionary, the word snicket is defined as "a passageway between walls or fences", and ginnel is "a narrow passageway between or through buildings".

See also
Vennel
Wynd
Easement

References

Types of streets
Footpaths
 
Hiking
Landscape architecture
Pedestrian infrastructure
Types of thoroughfares
Urban design
Psychogeography